Sakda Kaewboonmee is a professional footballer from Thailand. He currently plays for TTM Samut Sakhon in the Thailand Premier League.

He played for Thailand Tobacco Monopoly FC in the 2005 ASEAN Club Championship.

References

Living people
Sakda Kaewboonmee
1982 births
Association football defenders
Sakda Kaewboonmee